Skel may refer to:

Steffen Skel (born 1972), German luger
Skel Roach (1871–1958), American baseball player and coach

See also
Skell (disambiguation)